Nowgong College is an autonomous college affiliated to Gauhati University. Established in 1944, it is one of the oldest co-educational colleges of Assam, situated in the city of Nagaon. It was initially established with the permission of the University of Calcutta but later, in 1948, the college was accorded affiliation to the Gauhati University. On 22nd December 2020, the college was granted autonomy by the University Grants Commission for a period of 10 years.

History 

Established in 1944, with the permission of University of Calcutta, Nowgong College was the first higher educational institution of Central Assam, one of the oldest in Assam and the entire Northeast. It was founded with the efforts of Jananeta Motiram Bora, the Founder President of the Governing Body of the College, who was the Chairman of the Nowgong Local Board at that time. After being elected as the MLA from the Nowgong (South East) LAC in 1946 from the Indian National Congress, Bora served as the Minister of Land and Revenue in Lokapriya Gopinath Bordoloi's Cabinet, and played an active role in procuring land, building infrastructure and arranging funds for the College; he helped in acquiring the Government Dak Bungalow and the construction of Bordoloi Bhavan, the first building that came up in the present exclusive campus of Nowgong College. The other founding fathers of Nowgong College include social worker Brindaban Goswami, Purna Chandra Sarmah, Pratap Chandra Sarmah, Mohi Chandra Borah, Haladhar Bhuyan, Bimala Kanta Borah, Dr. Lalit Baruah, Yog Singh Chetry, Priya Ranjan Sengupta and Priyanath Sen; they were the first financiers and policymakers of the College. Sahityacharya Jajneswar Sarma, initially a Professor of Jorhat's Jagannath Barooah College, was the first Principal of Nowgong College; he was a scholar of English, Assamese and Sanskrit literature, who later served as the President of the Asam Sahitya Sabha.

On 7th August 1944, at 6 pm, Nowgong College, with a faculty strength of 7 teachers, officially began its first class with 7 students in a classroom of the Dawson High School. The College Administration later came to possess the hostels of the Nowgong Government High School, on lease, from the Govt. of Assam.

After Motiram Bora, Dr. Surya Kumar Bhuyan, a renowned historian and litterateur, served as the President of the Governing Body of the College; he and Principal Sarma, together, laid down the academic foundation of the College. Nowgong College was accorded affiliation to the newly-established Gauhati University in 1948, during the Vice Chancellorship of Krishna Kanta Handique.

Courses offered 
Under-Graduate Courses

 Bachelor of Arts (B.A.) with Honors in Arabic, Assamese, Bengali, Economics, Education, English, Geography, Hindi, History, Philosophy, Political Science and Sanskrit.
 Bachelor of Commerce (B.Com.)
 Bachelor of Science (B.Sc.) with Honors in Botany, Chemistry, Mathematics, Physics, Statistics and Zoology.
 Bachelor of Vocational Education (B.Voc.) in Travel & Tourism Management and Medical Lab Technology.
Post-Graduate Courses

 Master of Arts (M.A.) in Assamese, Education, English, History and Philosophy.
 Master of Science (M.Sc.) in Botany, Chemistry and Zoology.

Departments

Arts

Arabic
 Assamese
 Bengali
Economics
Education
 English
Geography
Hindi
History
Philosophy
Political Science
Sanskrit

Science
Botany
Chemistry
Mathematics
Physics
Statistics
Zoology

Commerce

Students' Union 
The Nowgong College Students' Union (NCSU) was established in 1970. Anil Sharma served as the first General Secretary of the Union.

Current Executive Members 
President: Angarag Sandilya

General Secretary: Niranjan Borah

Assistant General Secretary: Tusa Ranjan Bora

Secretary, Debate & Symposium Section: Anindita Roy

Secretary, Literary Section: Atlanta Goswami

Secretary, Games & Sports Section: Rajjeet Das

Assistant Secretary, Games & Sports Section: Bhargab Bhusan Bora

Secretary, Cultural Section: Shruti Bharadwaz

Secretary, Music Section: Angshuman Goswami

Secretary, Fine Arts Section: Partha Pratim Bharali

Secretary, Social Services Section: Bhanjyoti Gayan

Secretary, Student Welfare Section: Bhargabi Borah

Secretary, Boys' Common Room: Debashish Roy

Secretary, Girls' Common Room: Sabana Siddika Khanam

References

External links
Nowgong College
Gauhati University

Universities and colleges in Assam
Colleges affiliated to Gauhati University
Educational institutions established in 1944
1944 establishments in India